The Serie B 1977–78 was the forty-sixth tournament of this competition played in Italy since its creation.

Teams
Cremonese, Pistoiese and Bari had been promoted from Serie C, while Sampdoria, Catanzaro and Cesena had been relegated from Serie A.

Final classification

Results

References and sources
Almanacco Illustrato del Calcio - La Storia 1898-2004, Panini Edizioni, Modena, September 2005

Serie B seasons
2
Italy